Smithy Bridge railway station serves the village of Smithy Bridge and Hollingworth Lake near Rochdale in Greater Manchester, England.

Facilities
The station is unstaffed, but there are ticket machines available to allow intending passengers to purchase or collect tickets prior to travelling.  Both platforms have waiting shelters and step-free access.

Services

There is a basic half-hourly service (with peak period extras) from the station to Manchester Victoria southbound and to  northbound on weekdays. From there, trains continue alternately to  via  and to Leeds via .

In the early morning and evenings trains to Leeds run via Halifax but on the same frequency, whilst in Sundays the service is hourly and provided by the Southport/Manchester to Blackburn trains.  From the December 2019 timetable change, services will start or terminate at Wigan westbound, with passengers needing to change there for onward connections to Southport.

History
The station was first opened by the Lancashire & Yorkshire Railway in October 1868. In 1915, the station was the scene of a tragic accident involving an express train and an empty stock train. Four people died and many others were injured. It was closed on 2 May 1960 by British Rail but reopened on its original site, albeit with a slightly different platform layout, on 19 August 1985 with financial assistance from Greater Manchester PTE. The signal box here, which controlled the level crossing and acted as a 'fringe' box to Preston PSB from 1973 onwards, was downgraded in late 2011 from a block post to a crossing box. Smithy Bridge Crossing box was closed early in 2014 and has since been demolished.

Notes

References
The Weighvers Seaport by A W Colligan in association with George Kelsall

External links

Railway stations in the Metropolitan Borough of Rochdale
DfT Category F1 stations
Former Lancashire and Yorkshire Railway stations
Railway stations in Great Britain opened in 1868
Railway stations in Great Britain closed in 1960
Railway stations in Great Britain opened in 1985
Railway stations opened by British Rail
Reopened railway stations in Great Britain
Northern franchise railway stations
Littleborough, Greater Manchester